The Emmiyangal, also known as the Amijangal, are an indigenous Australian people of the Northern Territory in Australia,

Language
Emmi is one of the Marranj languages of the Western Daly family once widely spoken on the coast of Anson Bay southwest of Darwin. It may be mutually intelligible with Patjtjamalh.

The leading authority on the Emmiyangal, Lysbeth Ford, estimated in the late 90s that Emmi had approximately two dozen speakers. In 2003 Barbara Grimes set the figure at around 30.

Country
The Emmiyangal are an Anson Bay people. More precisely Bill Stranner located the Emmiyangal on the coastal area running south where the Daly River, flows into the Timor Sea, and as far as the vicinity of about Red Cliff. Emmiyangal tradition places them between Banagaya and Mabulhuk (Cape Ford).

People
The Emmiyangal were once thought to be closely related to the Wogait, Arthur Capell, and Stanner claiming that the two were virtually interchangeable ( "virtually identical.") Their closest linguistic and cultural ties are now known to be with the Menhdheyangal. On the basis of differences in dialect between the two, however, Tindale designated them as an independent tribal reality. Today the majority of Emmiyangal reside either at the government settlement of Belyuen on the Cox Peninsula, with a single family at the Balgal outstation at Anson Bay, and another at Wadeye.

Alternative names
 Ami.
 Ame.

Notes

Citations

Sources

Aboriginal peoples of the Northern Territory